The Mosotho ambassador in Washington, D. C. is the official representative of the Government in Maseru to the Government of the United States.

List of representatives

References 

 
United States
Lesotho
1966 establishments in Lesotho